Cervicorniphora alcicornis is a species of Australian hoverfly, and the only species in the genus Cervicorniphora.

References

Diptera of Australasia
Hoverfly genera
Microdontinae
Monotypic Diptera genera